James Carpenter may refer to:

James Carpenter (actor) (fl. 1980s–2010s), Shakespearean actor in the San Francisco Bay Area
James Carpenter (architect) (born 1949), American light artist and designer
James Carpenter (astronomer) (1840–1899), British astronomer
James Carpenter (American football) (born 1989), American football offensive lineman
James Carpenter (cricketer) (born 1975), former English cricketer
James Carpenter (fencer) (born 1962), American fencer
James C. Carpenter, American engineer; covered-bridge builder
James Edward Carpenter (1841–1901), United States Army officer
James Edwin Ruthven Carpenter Jr. (1867–1932), American architect
James Henry Carpenter (1846–1898), American engineer and industrialist
James Madison Carpenter (1888–1983), American Methodist minister and musicologist
James R. Carpenter (1867–1943), member of the Wyoming Senate
Jimmy Carpenter, American electric blues saxophonist, singer, songwriter, arranger and record producer